Fillmore Street is a street in San Francisco, California which starts in the Lower Haight neighborhood and travels northward through the Fillmore District and Pacific Heights and ends in the Marina District. It serves as the main thoroughfare and namesake for the Fillmore District neighborhood. The street is named after American President Millard Fillmore.

Culture

The part of Fillmore Street that runs through the Fillmore neighborhood reflects the neighborhood's diversity: family-owned neighborhood-serving retail mixes with chain stores, jazz clubs, ethnic restaurants of many varieties, and empty storefronts. Some of the stores, restaurants, and clubs lost to redevelopment are memorialized by plaques on the sidewalk. Other ties to the neighborhood's past remain as well; for example, the building that once housed Jimbo's Bop City—a nightclub frequented by noted jazz musicians of the 1940s and 1950s—was moved during redevelopment to Fillmore Street, where it now houses an Afrocentric bookstore, Marcus Bookstore.

Fillmore Street is also known for "the Triangle", which is where Fillmore meets Greenwich street. Triangle is an infamous area, describing 3 corners of the intersection with the bars Balboa Cafe, East Side West, and City Tavern.

History
The street grid west of Larkin was laid out in the 1880s and soon acquired the name "The Fillmore" after the street hosting a new core commercial area. Streetcar service on Fillmore started in July 1895; the following month the Fillmore Counterbalance was installed to traverse the steep 24.54% grade of Pacific Heights between Green and Broadway.

Following the 1906 San Francisco earthquake, Fillmore was left largely intact. The first streetcar to run after the fires ran on Fillmore and several of the city's theaters and department stores relocated to the road following the disaster. Between 1907 and 1943, several decorative arches lined the street's intersections — these were removed and used as scrap metal for the war effort.

See also
Fillmore District, San Francisco, California
The Fillmore
22 Fillmore

References

External links

Streets in San Francisco